Maghavuz or Chardagly is a village that is, de facto, in the Martakert Province of the breakaway Republic of Artsakh; de jure it is in the Tartar District of Azerbaijan, in the disputed region of Nagorno-Karabakh. The village has an ethnic Armenian-majority population, and also had an Armenian majority in 1989.

History 
During the Soviet period, the village was part of the Mardakert District of the Nagorno-Karabakh Autonomous Oblast.

Historical heritage sites 
Historical heritage sites in and around the village include a medieval village, a chapel built in 1260, a 13th-century khachkar, and the 19th-century St. George's Church.

Economy and culture 
The population is mainly engaged in agriculture, animal husbandry, and mining. As of 2015, the village has a municipal building, a secondary school, three shops, and a medical centre. The community of Maghavuz includes the village of Kmkadzor.

Demographics 
The village had 468 inhabitants in 2005, and 540 inhabitants in 2015.

References

External links 

 

Populated places in Martakert Province
Populated places in Tartar District